How Late'll Ya Play 'Til? is an album by David Bromberg.  His fifth album, it was released by Fantasy Records as a two-disc LP record in 1976.

How Late'll Ya Play 'Til? was recorded in California.  The first disc was recorded at Fantasy Studios in Berkeley, the Record Plant in Sausalito, and Cherokee Studios in Los Angeles.  The second disc was recorded live, on June 18 and 19, 1976, at the Great American Music Hall in San Francisco.

The album was released on CD as two separate titles.  How Late'll Ya Play 'Til? Volume 1: Live contains all six tracks from the second disc of the double LP, along with two additional tracks, "Loaded and Laid" and "Make Me a Pallet", that were not on the LP release.  How Late'll Ya Play 'Til? Volume 2: Studio contains all eleven tracks from the first disc, along with three added tracks — "Kitchen Girl," "Long Afternoons" and "Nashville Again".

Critical reception

When the album was released, Billboard wrote, "...in his first LP for Fantasy [Bromberg] is taking a solid commercial shot at presenting his specialized style in the most elegant support package possible. This is a twin-disk set, evenly divided between live and studio cuts. Bromberg's virtuoso guitar picking and insinuating voice is backed with a horn group that comes on like a cross between the Dirt Band and Springsteen's E-St. group. The leader flashes brightly through his own tongue-in-cheek originals and raunchy blues ballads by the likes of Blind Willie McTell or Robert Johnson. A well-thought-out fan winner."

Reviewing the record for Allmusic, William Ruhlmann said, "Bromberg's band, with two horns and a fiddle player, is capable of playing just about any style of popular music, and most of them are here on a double album, half recorded in the studio and half live. (Fantasy has also issued the two discs separately.) The standout inclusion is Bromberg's "Will Not Be Your Fool", which became his onstage showstopper from here on out."

In Allmusic's review of the Volume 1: Live CD, Richard Foss wrote, "David Bromberg has been such an effective sideman for so long, it could be possible to not notice what a wonderful entertainer the man is when he is at center stage. How Late'll Ya Play 'Til?, Vol. 1 catches Bromberg and a crack band having a fine time on mostly humorous tunes. Of course, Bromberg does play guitar throughout the album, but the real attraction here is his bluesy vocal turns and his razor-sharp comedic timing. Though "Will Not Be Your Fool" is his signature piece and is very well performed here, the highlight is the incredible "Bullfrog Blues"."

Track listing

LP disc one — CD Volume 2: Studio
LP side 1:
"Danger Man II" (David Bromberg) – 3:40 
"Get Up and Go" / fiddle tunes (Bromberg / traditional, arranged by Bromberg) – 4:46
"Summer Wages" (Ian Tyson) – 3:53
"Dallas Rag" / "Maple Leaf Rag" (arranged by David Laibman / arranged by Bromberg) – 1:43
"Whoopee Ti Yi Yo" (traditional, arranged by Bromberg) – 2:55
"Young Westley" (Mary McCaslin) – 3:10
LP side 2:
"Dyin' Crapshooter's Blues" (Willie McTell) – 3:38
"Bluebird" (Bromberg) – 2:09
"Idol with a Golden Head" (Jerry Leiber, Mike Stoller) – 3:47
"Chubby Thighs" (Steve Burgh) – 4:20
"Kaatskill Serenade" (Bromberg) – 4:40
CD bonus tracks:
"Kitchen Girl" (traditional) – 2:12
"Long Afternoons" (Paul Siebel) – 4:10
"Nashville Again" (Siebel) – 3:29

LP disc two — CD Volume 1: Live
LP side 3:
"Sloppy Drunk" (Bromberg) – 4:05
"Bullfrog Blues" (Bromberg, Terwilliger) – 16:06
LP side 4:
"Sweet Home Chicago" (Robert Johnson) – 3:54
"Come On in My Kitchen" (Johnson) – 3:10
"Will Not Be Your Fool" (Bromberg) – 7:59
"Such a Night" (Mac Rebennack) – 4:41
CD bonus tracks:
"Loaded and Laid" (David McKenzie) – 3:19
"Make Me a Pallet" (Joe Parish) – 6:07

Personnel

Musicians
David Bromberg – electric guitar, acoustic guitar, mandolin, vocals
Lem Burger – electric guitar
Steve Burgh – guitar
Cam and Bert Cheese – electric guitar
Hank DeVito – pedal steel guitar
Peter Ecklund – trumpet, mellophone, cornet
Dick Fegy – electric guitar, banjo, tenor banjo, mandolin
John Firmin – tenor saxophone, soprano saxophone, baritone saxophone, clarinet
Le Grand Fromage – guitar, acoustic guitar, vocals
Nathan Gershman – cello
Brantley Kearns – fiddle, electric fiddle, mandolin, vocals
Phil Kearns – vocals
George Kindler – fiddle
Bernie Leadon – vocals
Curt Linberg – trombone
Hugh McDonald – bass, vocals
Steve Mosley – drums, vocals
Alex Nieman – viola
Herb Pedersen – vocals
Mac Rebennack – piano
Jim Rothermel – recorder
Jane Sharp – vocals
Phoebe Snow – vocals
Evan Stover – fiddle

Production
Steve Burgh – producer
David Bromberg – producer
Phil Kaffel – recording engineer, sides 1 and 2
Tom Flye – recording engineer, sides 3 and 4
Rich Ehrman – assistant recording engineer, sides 3 and 4
Doug Rider – additional recording
Warren Dewey – remix
George Tutko – remix assistant
Lee Hulko – mastering
Phil Carroll – art direction
Lance Anderson – design
Phil Bray – photography

References

David Bromberg albums
1976 albums
Fantasy Records albums
Albums recorded at the Great American Music Hall